Igor Nikolayevich Remizov (born 21 October 1970 in Moscow) is a former Russian football player.

References

1970 births
Footballers from Moscow
Living people
Soviet footballers
FC FShM Torpedo Moscow players
Russian footballers
FC Tyumen players
Russian Premier League players

Association football defenders